Cathedral of our lady of China or Our Lady Queen of China Cathedral is located in Tainan city, Taiwan and serves as the cathedral for the Roman Catholic diocese of Tainan, Taiwan. It is dedicated to Mother Mary. The design of the church is a palatial Chinese architecture.

History 
The cathedral was built by Most Rev. Stanislaus Lokuang, who was the first bishop of Tainan, in 1963. It was dedicated on 19 March 1964 by Archbishop Giuseppe Caprio, Apostolic Internuncio to China.

Architecture 
The cathedral is built in ancient Chinese palatial architecture which resembles to the Tao temples.

Dedication 
The cathedral is dedicated to an apparition of Mother Mary, Our Lady of China, in China during boxer rebellion in 1900.

References

See also 
 List of cathedrals in Taiwan
 Christianity in Taiwan

Cathedrals
Christianity in Taiwan
Cathedrals in Taiwan
Cathedrals in Asia
Churches in Tainan
1964 establishments in Taiwan
Religious buildings and structures completed in 1964